Clemens Legolas Telling better known as Clemens and MC Clemens (born 8 October 1979 in Roskilde, Denmark) is a Danish rapper, singer, music writer, actor.

Clemens started as a DJ in 1989 and was known as MC Clemens, winning many freestyle prizes in Denmark. In 1997 he had his debut album release Regnskabets Time with commercial success followed up in 1999 with Den Anden Verden. This album won him a Grammy for Best Hip Hop Album and a grant from the Arts Foundation. The same year he collaborated with Swedish rapper Petter and they both toured Denmark, Sweden, Finland and Norway. In 2001, he released Professionel Bla Bla that won him Best Hip Hop Hit by the P3 station. In 2006 he toured Japan with over 40 shows. He enjoyed a comeback in 2010 with a #1 hit "Champion" on the Tracklisten, the official Danish Singles Chart.

Clemens has also written the lyrics of many theatrical acts, including a breakdance version of Nøddeknækkeren (The Nutcracker) that was played every year from 2004 to 2008. Clemens also wrote all the lyrics for the musical Matador in 2007, an opera directed by Peter Langdal and most of the lyrics for the piece 69 in 2008 directed by Niclas Bendixen. Matador musical was released on DVD in late 2008 and Nøddeknækkeren (The Nutcracker) in late 2009.

Clemens has also appeared as a supporting character in the television series Anna Pihl.

Clemens also collaborated with rock / rap band Die Dumme Dänen on Sony BMG

Awards
Three times - 1999, 2007, 2009:Arts Foundation Prize 
2000: Grammy of the Year - Best Hip Hop Album
2001: P3 Award of the Year - Best Hip Hop radio hit
2002: Wilhelm Hansen Foundation Prize

Discography

Albums
in Die Dumme Dänen
2006: Spænd hjelmen
Solo charting album

Other albums
1997: Regnskabets Time
1999: Den Anden Verden
2001: Professionel Bla Bla
2004: Dans Med Døden
2007: Nye tider

Mixtapes
2008: Det Fortabte (mixtape)

Singles

Featured singles

References

External links
Clemens MySpace website
Die Dumme Dänen official website
Die Dumme Dänen MySpace website

1979 births
Living people
Danish rappers
People from Roskilde